Rheinsberg is a town and a municipality in the Ostprignitz-Ruppin district, in Brandenburg, Germany. It is located on lake  and the river Rhin, approximately 20 km north-east of Neuruppin and 75 km north-west of Berlin.

History

Frederick the Great, while still Crown Prince, designed and moved into a restored chateau in Rheinsberg shortly after his 1733 marriage to Elisabeth Christine of Brunswick-Bevern.  Here he experienced his "Rheinsberg Period", an era marked by regular correspondence with Voltaire, boisterous celebration in the company of minor philosophers and musicians, and the writing of several works of political theory, including the Anti-Machiavel.

In 1870, the painter Eduard Gaertner and his family decided to leave the hectic atmosphere of Berlin and settle in Flecken Zechlin, a suburb of Rheinsberg - where he lived until his death in 1877.

Rheinsberg is the location for Kurt Tucholsky's Rheinsberg, a 1912 picture book for lovers based on an autobiographical weekend trip.

Demography

Geography

Lakes

Großer Prebelowsee
Großer Zechliner See
Schwarzer See
Tietzowsee
Zootzensee

Photogallery

Twin towns
 Huber Heights (Ohio, USA)

People from Rheinsberg 
 Gad Granach (1915–2011), German writer
 Erhard Egidi (1929–2014), German cantor, composer and organist
 Lothar Baumgarten (1944–2018), German artist

References

External links

 

Localities in Ostprignitz-Ruppin